Holmes may refer to:

People and fictional characters
 Holmes (surname), a list of people and fictional characters
 Sherlock Holmes, a fictional detective 
 Holmes (given name), a list of people
 Gordon Holmes, a penname used by Louis Tracy (1863–1928), British journalist and fiction writer

Places

In the United States
 Holmes, California, an unincorporated community
 Holmes, Iowa, an unincorporated community
 Holmes, Kentucky, an unincorporated community
 Holmes, Pennsylvania, an unincorporated community
 Holmes, a hamlet within Pawling (town), New York
 Holmes Township, Michigan
 Holmes City Township, Minnesota
 Holmes Township, Crawford County, Ohio
 Holmes County, Florida
 Holmes County, Mississippi
 Holmes County, Ohio
 Mount Holmes, Yellowstone National Park, Wyoming
 Fort Holmes, Mackinac Island, Michigan
 Holmes Island (Indiana), an island and community
 Holmes Island (Washington), an island
 Holmes Reservation, a conservation parcel in Plymouth, Massachusetts

In Antarctica
 Holmes Summit
 Holmes Glacier
 Holmes Hills
 Holmes Ridge
 Holmes Island (Antarctica)
 Holmes Rock
 Holmes Bluff
 Holmes Block, a bluff

In outer space
 17P/Holmes, a comet
 5477 Holmes, an asteroid
 Holmes (crater), a crater on Mars

Elsewhere
 Holmes, Northern Territory, Australia, a suburb in Darwin
 Holmes River, British Columbia, Canada
 Holmes, Lancashire, a village in West Lancashire, England

Schools
 Holmes Community College, Mississippi
 Holmes Junior/Senior High School, the oldest high school in Kentucky
 Holmes Middle School (Colorado Springs, Colorado)
 Holmes Middle School (Livonia, Michigan)

Ships
 , two British Royal Navy ships
 , two United States Navy ships

Other uses
 HOLMES 2, an IT system used by the police in the United Kingdom
 Holmes Airport, a former airport located in Queens in New York City
 Holmes railway station, Rotherham, South Yorkshire, England
 Holmes Products, a United States small-appliance producer
 Holmes (computer)
 Holmes (TV series), a news and current affairs show that aired in New Zealand
 Baron Holmes, two titles in the Peerage of Ireland

See also
 Holmes House (disambiguation), various houses on the National Register of Historic Places
 Holmes Towers, two public housing in Manhattan, New York City
 Holm (disambiguation)
 Holme (disambiguation)